Dynomiellini, is a tribe of beach flies in the family of Canacidae.

Genera
Canacea Cresson, 1924
Chaetocanace Hendel, 1914
Dynomiella Giordani Soika, 1956
Isocanace Mathis, 1982
Trichocanace Wirth, 1951
Xanthocanace Hendel, 1914

References

Canacidae
Brachycera tribes